Pakistan is a multi-party democracy. The country has many political parties and many times in past the country is ruled by coalition government.

The Parliament of Pakistan is bicameral, consisting of the National Assembly of Pakistan and the Senate.

Brief history and overviews 
The military-dominated Establishment has directly ruled Pakistan for nearly half of its existence since its creation in 1947, while frequently exerting covert dominance over the political leadership during the remainder. The Establishment in Pakistan includes the key decision-makers in the country's military and intelligence services, national security, as well as its foreign and domestic policies, including the state policies of aggressive Islamization during the military dictatorship of General Muhammad Zia-ul-Haq. However, the military establishment later reversed its support of political Islam under General Pervez Musharraf, who pursued enlightened moderation in the 2000s.

Till 1990, Pakistan Peoples Party (PPP) was the only major party of Pakistan. After Zulfiqar Ali Bhutto died, Benazir Bhutto took control and they remained a strong position throughout Pakistan. In 1990, Nawaz Sharif of Islami Jamhoori Ittehad (IJI) won the elections. Two major parties were in Pakistan. After IJI dissolved and Nawaz Sharif founded Pakistan Muslim League (N), PPP and PML(N) were the major two parties of Pakistan. In 1993, Peoples Party won the election again. In 1996, Pakistan Tehreek-e-Insaf was formed. In 2013, PTI took part in the elections and won 35 seats in the National Assembly of Pakistan. After the 2018 Pakistan elections, PTI became the government and became one of the three major parties of Pakistan.

In 2019, Pakistan Democratic Movement (PDM) was formed of many parties remove Establishment's involvement in politics.

Gilgit-Baltistan 

Pakistan Peoples Party won the first Gilgit-Baltistan elections and was the only major party of Gilgit-Baltistan with 20 seats out of 33. However, in 2015, Pakistan Muslim League (N) won 15 seats and became the major party of Gilgit-Baltistan and PPP only received one seat in the Gilgit-Baltistan Assembly. However, in the 2020 elections, Pakistan Tehreek-e-Insaf (PTI) won 16 seats and became the only major party of Gilgit-Baltistan with PPP winning 3 and PML(N) winning two seats.

Currently in Gilgit-Baltistan, any party can win and any party can go down.

National Assembly and Senate members

Unrepresented parties 
This is the list of registered parties that are currently unrepresented in Parliament and Provincial Assemblies.

Dissolved parties

Unregistered parties

Provincial Assembly members 
This is the list of parties that are currently represented in Provincial Assemblies of Sindh, Punjab, Balochistan, KPK and Gilgit-Baltistan Assembly:

See also 

 Politics of Pakistan
 List of ruling political parties by country

References

External links 

 

Politics of Pakistan
Pakistan
 
Political parties
Pakistan
Political parties